Pangasinan Five Star Bus Company, Incorporated, or simply known as Five Star, is one of the largest bus companies in the Philippines. It serves routes mainly to the provinces of Pangasinan, Nueva Ecija, Tarlac, Nueva Vizcaya, Quirino, Isabela and Cagayan

History
Five Star was founded in 1983 in Metro Manila. It started as a city operation firm using ordinary fare buses, its main sister company the Victory Liner is actually its parent. The Five Star Bus Company grew in the 90s, they started operations in Dagupan then later routes expanded to Cabanatuan, San Antonio, Tarlac City, Agno, Alaminos, Anda, Bolinao, San Carlos, Tayug, Santiago, Maddela, Piat, Tuguegarao and Solano, Nueva Vizcaya after the closure of Pangasinan Transportation Co., also known as Pantranco North Express Inc.

About Five Star
Five Star was founded in 1983, servicing routes to Dagupan, Pangasinan using non air-conditioned ordinary fare buses. They later expanded to other places in Pangasinan, Nueva Ecija, Isabela, Cagayan and Nueva Vizcaya.

Bus Terminals
Five Star's headquarters in Pasay is one of its largest terminals, with destinations in Nueva Ecija and Pangasinan. Its Cubao terminal in Quezon City is large enough that three bus companies use it: Five Star, Bataan Transit and Luzon Cisco Transport. Five Star also has a terminal in Avenida Manila which has trips to Dagupan, San Carlos and Cagayan Valley (Santiago and Solano Trips only). It also has terminals in Cabanatuan, San Antonio, Bolinao, Alaminos, Pangasinan, Agno, Anda, San Carlos, Tayug, Santiago, Tuguegarao, Maddela, Piat and Solano

Fleet
Five Star Bus Company uses and maintains these bus units:

Higer V91 KLQ6119QE3
Higer A80 KLQ6123K U-Tour 
Higer A80 KLQ6128LQ U-Tour
Higer A80 (with MAN R39 chassis and Golden Dragon XML6126 rear fascia)
Hino Grand Echo II RM2PSS
Hino Grand Metro RK1JST 
JAC HK6124AM1
Hyundai Universe Space Luxury
MAN AMC Tourist Star R39 18.350 HOCL
Golden Dragon XML6126 (with MAN R39 chassis)
Golden Dragon XML6127 Marcopolo (with MAN R39 chassis)
MAN SR Modulo 280
Nissan Diesel Santarosa JA450SSN
Nissan Diesel Eurobus RB46SR (Ordinary Bus unit)
Nissan Diesel Santarosa RB46SR
King Long XMQ6118Y2
Volvo B7R (in Volvo 9800 front fascia, super deluxe bus unit with lavatory on-board)

Modified By Five Star Bus Body:
Hino RM2P Grand Metro Body
Hino RK1JST V92 Eurobus Body
Hyundai Aero Space LS
MAN Yutong ZK6120 Body A80 D0836LOHO12
Nissan Diesel Yutong Body ZK6120 JA450SSN
Nissan Diesel Yutong Body ZK6120 RB46S
Nissan Diesel Yutong Body ZK6100HA RB46SR
Nissan Diesel Yutong ZK6100HA RB46S
Nissan Diesel Yutong ZK6120HE
Yutong ZK6119HA paired with Rear Engine L53SA
V92 Eurobus Body paired with Nissan Diesel Santarosa RB46S and Chassis Dong Feng LGG5XKBXV7K

Terminals

Metro Manila
Cubao - EDSA Cubao, Quezon City
Pasay - Aurora Blvd., Pasay (headquarters of Five Star)
Total Gas Station Balintawak - EDSA Balintawak, Quezon City
Avenida - Doroteo Jose St., Sta. Cruz, Manila'' (for Pangasinan, Solano, Tuguegarao and Santiago trips only)

Provincial

Cagayan Valley Region
Cagayan
Tuguegarao City - Balzain Highway, Tuguegarao City, Cagayan via TPLEX
Piat - Brgy. Poblacion I, Piat, Cagayan
Nueva Vizcaya
Solano - Brgy. Poblacion North, Solano, Nueva Vizcaya via TPLEX
Isabela
Santiago City - Brgy. Calao East, Santiago City, Isabela via TPLEX
Angadanan - ISELCO III Angadanan, Isabela via Alicia/TPLEX
Quirino
Maddela - Brgy. Poblacion Sur, Maddela, Qurino

Central Luzon Region
Nueva Ecija
Cabanatuan City - Cabanatuan Central Terminal, Brgy. Padre Crisostomo, Cabanatuan City, Nueva Ecija
Cabanatuan City - Zulueta St., Cabanatuan City, Nueva Ecija
San Antonio - Brgy. Poblacion, San Antonio, Nueva Ecija
Tarlac
Tarlac City - Siesta Bus Stop, Zamora St., Tarlac City, Tarlac
Pampanga
Angeles City - Marquee Mall Bus Terminal, Marquee Mall, Angeles City, Pampanga (for air-conditioned buses only)
Mabalacat City - Dau Bus Terminal, Mabalacat City, Pamapanga (ordinary fare and air-conditioned buses only)

Ilocos Region
Pangasinan
Agno - Brgy. Poblacion East, Agno, Pangasinan
Alaminos City - Quezon Ave., Alaminos City, Pangasinan
Anda - Brgy. Poblacion, Anda, Pangasinan
Bolinao - Poblacion Road, Bolinao, Pangasinan
Dagupan City - Perez Blvd., Dagupan City, Pangasinan
San Carlos City -  Rizal Ave., San Carlos City, Pangasinan
Tayug - Mabini St., Tayug, Pangasinan

Former Terminal

Metro Manila 

 Sampaloc - Legarda Street, Sampaloc Manila (Terminal was acquired again by Bicol Isarog Transport System)

Subsidiaries and sister companies 
Victory Liner
First North Luzon Transit
Bataan Transit
Luzon Cisco Transport Inc.
Bicol Isarog Transport System
Laguna Star Bus Transport System Inc. (Operated by First North Luzon Transit)
Citybus Inc. (Operated by First North Luzon Transit)
Maria de Leon Transportation (Operated by Bataan Transit)
San Quintin Bus Line
RJ Express

See also
GV Florida Transport
List of bus companies of the Philippines
Dagupan Bus Company
Baliwag Transit

References

External links

Bus companies of the Philippines
Companies based in Pasay